The UCF Knights softball program represents the University of Central Florida in the sport of softball. The Knights compete in Division I of the National Collegiate Athletics Association (NCAA) and the American Athletic Conference (The American). The Knights play their home games at the UCF Softball Complex on UCF's main campus in Orlando, Florida. The Knights are coached by head coach Cindy Ball-Malone. In the twenty year history of the program, the Knights have won three American regular season championships, four conference tournament championships, and have nine appearances in the NCAA Tournament.

History
The UCF softball program was founded in 2002 under Renee Luers-Gillispie. The Knights played their first games on February 2, losing the first contest 2–3 to Bethune–Cookman, and winning their second game against Arkansas, 6–5. The program played its first four seasons in the Atlantic Sun Conference. In their last year in the conference, the Knights won their first conference tournament championship, defeating Troy twice in one day, and made their first NCAA tournament appearance. In 2005, UCF moved to Conference USA, where they remained until joining the American Athletic Conference in 2013.

The UCF Softball Complex opened on March 14, 2006, with the Knights winning two games that day, a 10–9 victory over Marshall and a 7–3 win over Furman. In 2008, Gillespie would lead the Knights to their second conference tournament championship, their first in C-USA, and their second appearance in the NCAA tournament, by defeating #9 Houston. During the tournament, UCF defeated #1 Florida 1–0. In both 2010 and 2012, Gillespie led the Knights to the NCAA tournament.

In the past decade, the Knights own nine no-hitters, including two perfect games. The first two no-hitters in program history were perfect games, and four no-hitters were pitched by Allison Kime. Stephanie Best holds the club record for batting average with .384, home runs with 71 and triples with 13. After their careers at UCF, three Knights have played in the National Pro Fastpitch League (NPF); Stephanie Best, Allison Kime and Breanne Javier.

Coaches

Seasons

See also
UCF Knights baseball
List of University of Central Florida alumni
List of University of Central Florida faculty and administrators
List of NCAA Division I softball programs

References

External links